The National Conservative Convention (NCC), is the most senior body of the Conservative Party's voluntary wing. The National Convention effectively serves as the Party's internal Parliament, and is made up of its 800 highest-ranking Party Officers.

The composition and functions of the NCC have evolved since its establishment in 1867. It has previously had a major role in policy-making and the planning of Party Conferences. Today, its primary purposes are to take charge of internal Party affairs and representing the views of Party members. Most crucially, it elects five members each year to sit on the Conservative Party Board.

History and structure
The NCC was first established as the National Union of Conservative and Unionist Associations. Its purpose was to oversee the running of the Party across the country, and plan Party Conferences. These functions remain largely the same today, and every year the President of the NCC continues to officially open the Party Conference.

Over time, the NUCUA's membership became more clearly defined, and has broadly been the same since the Party's set of extensive internal reforms following their defeat in the 1945 General Election. In 1998, new Party leader William Hague carried out another extensive reform which led to the NUCUA's renaming as the National Conservative Convention. In recent years, the Convention's influence over the running of the Party and its campaigning methods has increased heavily. Any changes to the Constitution of the Conservative Party must be approved by a majority vote of the NCC, and it plays a pivotal role in the inception and implementation of Party reforms, such as the Conservative Party Review.

The NCC includes a mix of appointed and directly and indirectly elected Party Officers. When members of the public join the Party, they are attached to the Conservative Association of the constituency they reside in. Party members elect their local Association Chairmen who sit on the Convention, and other local officials. Each Chairman and one Deputy Chairman sit on an Area Council, typically covering one or two Counties and several local authorities and constituencies. These Councils annually elect the Party's senior volunteers; Area and Regional Officers. All senior volunteers (approximately 150 Area and 30 Regional Officers) sit on the Convention. In addition to this, the Conservative Women's Organisation and Conservative Future (including their predecessor organisations) each send 40 delegates to the NCC, though Conservative Future has not sent delegates since its dissolution.

The NCC meets three times a year; at Conservative Party Conference, the Conservative Spring Forum, and for its own election meeting, usually held in the summer. The Convention Executive (elected annually by its members) consists of its Chairman, who serves for three years, three Vice-Presidents, who each serve for three years, and the President, who serves for one year. Generally speaking, after finishing their term, an outgoing Vice-President is elected as the President and Chairs that year's Party Conference. Officers typically run for election for the NCC's Executive only after several decades of experience in the Party. The Party Leader and Chairman attend Convention meetings and address its members. There are also regular meetings of Senior Volunteers (Area and Regional Officers) in between full Convention meetings.

Chairmen of National Conservative Convention
(Until 1988, the National Union of Conservative and Unionist Associations)
1925: Sir Percy Woodhouse
1926: Dame Caroline Bridgeman
1927: Sir Robert Sanders MP
1928: John Gretton MP
1929: Gwilym Rowlands
1930: The Countess of Iveagh MP
1931: The Honourable George Herbert (also served as President in 1935) (No Conference held)
1932: The Earl Howe
1933: Sir Robert Geoffrey Ellis MP
1934: Miss Regina Evans
1935: Sir William Cope (later became Lord Cope)
1936: Sir Henry Leonard Brassey (later became Lord Brassey of Apethorpe)
1937: Mrs Clara Fyfe
1938: Sir Eugene Ramsden MP (No Conference held)
1939: Nigel Colman MP (No Conference held)
1940: The Lady Hillingdon (No Conference held)
1941: Sir Cuthbert Headlam MP (No Conference held)
1942: Councillor Robert Catterall (No Conference held)
1943: Councillor Robert Catterall
1944: Mrs Lionel Whitehead
1945: Rab Butler MP
1946: Major Richard Proby
1947: Hon. Mrs Henry Hornyold-Strickland
1948: Sir Herbert Williams
1949: Douglas Graham
1950: Anthony Nutting MP
1951: Mrs Lorne Sayers (No Conference held)
1952: Charles Waterhouse MP
1953: Mrs John Warde
1954: Sir Godfrey Llewellyn, Bt
1955: Hon. Evelyn Emmett, MP
1956: Sir Eric Edwards
1957: Mrs Walter Elliot
1958: Sir Stanley Bell
1959-1960: Sir Edward Brown
1961: Sir Douglas Glover MP
1962: Sir John Howard
1963: Mrs TCR Shepherd
1964-1965: Sir Max Bemrose
1966: Sir Dan Mason (Sir Robert Davies, Oct 1966-Feb 1967)
1967: Mrs Charles Doughty
1968: Sir Theodore Constantine
1969: DP Crossman
1970: Sir Edwin Leather
1971: Mrs Unity Lister
1972: William Harris
1973: Mrs Roy Smith
1974-1975: Sir Alastair Graesser
1976: Miss Shelagh Roberts
1977: David Sells
1978: Sir Herbert Redfearn
1979: David Davenport-Handley
1980: Dame Ann Springman
1981: Sir Fred Hardman
1982: Donald Walters
1983: Peter Lane
1984: Dame Pamela Hunter
1985: Sir Basil Feldman
1986: Patrick Lawrence
1987: Dame Joan Seccombe
1988: Sir Ian McLeod
2000-2003: John Taylor, Baron Taylor of Holbeach
2003-2006: Raymond Monbiot CBE
2006-2009: Don Porter CBE
2009-2012: Jeremy Middleton CBE
2012-2015: Baroness Pidding CBE
2015-2018: Robert Semple CBE
2018-2021: Lord Sharpe of Epsom OBE
2021-: Peter Booth

Presidents of National Conservative Convention

1925 Gerald Loder (had also served as Chairman of the National Union of Conservative and Constitutional Associations in 1899)
1926 George Lane-Fox
1927 Viscount Tredegar
1928 The Lord Queenborough
1929 The Lord Faringdon
1930 Neville Chamberlain MP
1931 Neville Chamberlain MP (No Conference held)
1932 Lord Stanley
1933 The Earl of Plymouth
1934 The Lord Bayford
1935 The Honourable George Herbert (had also served as Chairman in 1931, although no Conference was held)
1936 The Lord Ebbisham
1949: The Viscount Swinton
1950: Sir David Maxwell Fyfe, MP
1951: The Lord Ramsden
1952: Sir Thomas Dugdale, MP
1953: The Marquess of Salisbury
1954: Anthony Eden MP
1955: Mrs Lorne Sayers
1956: Rab Butler MP
1957: The Earl of Woolton
1958: Sir Richard Proby, Bt
1959-60: Henry Brooke MP
1961: The Viscount Hailsham
1962: Sir Godfrey Llewellyn, Bt
1963: The Earl of Home
1964-65: The Viscountess Davidson
1966: Selwyn Lloyd MP
1967: The Lord Chelmer
1968: Reginald Maudling MP
1969: The Baroness Brooke of Ystradfellte
1970: Iain Macleod MP
1971: William Whitelaw MP
1972: Dame Margaret Shepherd
1973: Anthony Barber MP
1974-75: Peter Thomas MP
1976: The Lord Hewlett of Swettenham
1977: The Lord Carrington
1978: Dame Adelaide Doughty
1979: Francis Pym MP
1980: The Lord Constantine of Stanmore
1981: Edward du Cann MP
1982: Sir John Taylor
1983: Sir Geoffrey Howe MP
1984: Sir Alistair Graesser
1985: Sir Humphrey Atkins MP
1986: Sir Charles Johnston
1987: George Younger MP
1988: Dame Shelagh Roberts MEP
1989: The Viscount Whitelaw of Penrith
1994-1995: Sir William Royden Stuttaford KBE
1999-2000: John Taylor, Baron Taylor of Holbeach
2000-2001: Raymond Monbiot CBE
2001-2002: Jean Searle OBE
2002-2003: Caroline Abel-Smith OBE
2003-2004: Don Porter CBE
2004-2005: Richard Stephenson OBE
2005-2006: Paul Marland
2006-2007: Stephen Castle
2007-2008: Simon Mort
2008-2009: Jeremy Middleton CBE
2009-2010: Emma Pidding CBE
2010-2011: Charles Barwell OBE
2011-2012: Fiona, Lady Hodgson CBE
2012-2013: Paul Swaddle OBE
2013-2014: Charles Heslop OBE
2014-2015: Robert Semple CBE
2015-2016: Steve Bell CBE
2016-2017: Gerry Yates OBE
2017-2018: Andrew Sharpe OBE
2018-2019: Thomas Harvey Spiller OBE
2019-2020: Pamela Hall OBE
2020-2021: Andrew Colborne-Baber OBE
2021-2022: Debbie Toon MBE
2022-2023: Fleur Butler

Notes

Unless otherwise stated, details of Chairmen and Presidents of the NUCUA are taken from British Political Facts 1900-1994 by David Butler and Gareth Butler.
Conservative Conference Guide, 1989 (Eyre & Spottiswoode)

Organisation of the Conservative Party (UK)
History of the Conservative Party (UK)
 
Annual events in the United Kingdom
Political events
Political events in the United Kingdom
Political party assemblies